The men's épée was one of eight fencing events on the fencing at the 1968 Summer Olympics programme. It was the fifteenth appearance of the event. The competition was held from 21 to 22 October 1968. 72 fencers from 28 nations competed. Each nation was limited to three fencers. The event was won by Győző Kulcsár of Hungary, the nation's first medal in the men's individual épée. Defending gold medalist Grigory Kriss of the Soviet Union took silver, becoming the eighth man to win multiple medals in the event and extending the Soviet podium streak to three Games. Italy returned to the podium as well after a one-Games absence broke its six-Games gold medal streak, with Gianluigi Saccaro (who came within a barrage of a medal in 1964) earning bronze.

Background
This was the 15th appearance of the event, which was not held at the first Games in 1896 (with only foil and sabre events held) but has been held at every Summer Olympics since 1900.

Seven of the eight quarterfinalists from the 1964 Games returned: gold medalist Grigory Kriss of the Soviet Union, silver medalist Bill Hoskyns of Great Britain, fourth-place finisher Gianluigi Saccaro of Italy, fifth-place finisher Bogdan Gonsior of Poland, sixth-place finisher Claude Bourquard of France, and seventh-place finishers Orvar Lindwall of Sweden and Franz Rompza of the United Team of Germany (now competing for West Germany). Hoskyns (1958) was a former World Champion, as were Roland Losert of Austria (1963) and Zoltán Nemere of Hungary (1965); Kriss would win in 1971. The two-time reigning World Champion (1966 and 1967) was Aleksey Nikanchikov of the Soviet Union.

Puerto Rico made its debut in the event. East Germany and West Germany competed separately for the first time. Belgium and the United States each appeared for the 14th time, tied for most among nations.

Competition format

The 1968 tournament continued to use a mix of pool play and knockout rounds, but with substantial changes from 1964. The first two rounds were round-robin pool play, followed by a knockout round, finishing with another pool for the final. Early-round barrages were eliminated and the knockout round was a modified double elimination round.

 Round 1: 12 pools, with 6 or 7 fencers in each pool (one pool had 5 due to a withdrawal). The top 4 fencers in each pool advanced, cutting the field from 72 to 48.
 Round 2: 8 pools, with 6 fencers per pool. Again, the top 4 fencers advanced, reducing the number of remaining fencers from 48 to 32.
 Knockout round: This was a modified double-elimination tournament. The 32 fencers were divided into 4 groups of 8. The winner of the "winners bracket" in each group advanced to the final pool. The winner of the "losers bracket" from each group faced the winner of a different group's "losers bracket," with the winner of that match advancing to the final pool as well. The knockout round winnowed the fencers from 32 to 6.
 Final round: A final pool with the 6 remaining fencers determined the medals and 4th through 6th place. A barrage was used if necessary.

Schedule

All times are Central Standard Time (UTC-6)

Results

Round 1

Round 1 Pool A

Round 1 Pool B

Round 1 Pool C

Round 1 Pool D

Round 1 Pool E

Round 1 Pool F

Round 1 Pool G

Round 1 Pool H

Round 1 Pool I

Round 1 Pool J

Round 1 Pool K 

John Bouchier-Hayes of Ireland was entered in this pool but did not compete.

Round 1 Pool L

Round 2

Round 2 Pool A

Round 2 Pool B

Round 2 Pool C

Round 2 Pool D

Round 2 Pool E

Round 2 Pool F

Round 2 Pool G

Round 2 Pool H

Double elimination rounds

Winners brackets

Winners group 1

Winners group 2

Winners group 3

Winners group 4

Losers brackets

Losers group 1

Losers group 2

Final round 

 Barrage

References

Epee men
Men's events at the 1968 Summer Olympics